Horsted may refer to:

Little Horsted, a village in East Sussex, England
Fort Horsted, a scheduled monument in Kent, England
Horstedt, Schleswig-Holstein, a municipality in Nordfriesland, Schleswig-Holstein, Germany

People with the surname
Eric Horsted, American television writer
Jesper Horsted (born 1997), American football player

See also
Horsted Keynes, a village in West Sussex, England
Horstead